The House of Montoire, started with Nihard, Lord of Montoire. Later, through the marriages of Plaisante de Montoire and Helvise Doubleau, the possessions of Mondoubleau and Fréteval Langeais were added.  The manor of Mondoubleau and, following the marriage of Pierre II de Montoire and Agnès de Vendôme, the county of Vendôme became part of the House of Montoire.

House of Montoire
Nihard (+ 1059), seigneur de Montoire

Plaisante of Montoire
1)Married, Eudes I of Doubleau (+1057), seigneur de Montdoubleau, 
2)Married, Aubry de Nouatre (+1072), seigneur de Montoire
    
Hugues II Doubleau (+1065), seigneur de Montdoubleau, son of Plaisante
     
Helvise Doubleau, daughter of Hugues II
1)Married, Payen de Fréteval (+1044), seigneur de Fréteval
2)Married, Hamelin II de Langeais (+1108), seigneur de Langeais and de Montoire, son of Gautier de Langeais, Viscount of Le Mans and Vendôme
         
1)Hildebert Payen, seigneur de Montdoubleau son of Payen of Freteval.
Married Aia.
         
2)Peter I of Montoire (+1135), seigneur de Montoire, son of Hamelin II.
Married, Ada
         
Philip de Montoire, seigneur de Montoire, son of Peter I.
1)Married, Aénor
2)Married Laetitia, Lady of Savonières
        
Peter II, seigneur de Montoire, son of Philip of Montoire and Laetitia.
Married, Agnès of Vendôme, daughter of Bouchard IV, Count of Vendôme
        
John IV (+1230), seigneur de Montoire, Count of Vendôme, son of Peter II.
Married, Eglantine
        
Peter (+1249), Count of Vendôme, son of John IV.
Married, Jeanne de Mayenne (+1246)
        
Bouchard V (1225+1271), Count of Vendôme, son of Peter.
Married, Marie de Roye
    
Jean V (1250+1315), Count of Vendôme, son of Bouchard V.
Married, Eléonore de Montfort, Lady of Castres
        
Bouchard VI (1290+1354), Count of Vendôme and Lord of Castres, son of John V.
Married in 1320, Alix de Dreux
    
Jean VI (+1364), Count of Vendôme and Lord of Castres, son of Bouchard VI.
Married, Jeanne de Ponthieu
        
Catherine de Vendôme (+1412), Countess of Vendôme and Castres, daughter of John VI.
Married, John I of Bourbon, Count of La Marche and of Vendôme
===>Counts of Vendôme through the House of Bourbon-La Marche
        
Bouchard VII (+1371), Count of Vendôme and Castres, son of John VI.
Married, Isabelle of Bourbon (+1371)
        
Jeanne de Vendôme (+1372), Countess of Vendôme and Castres, daughter of Bouchard VII.

Notes

References
 Broad, Jacqueline and Karen Green, Virtue, liberty, and toleration: political ideas of European women, 1400-1800, Springer, 2007.
 Bulletin de la Société d'émulation du Bourbonnais, Vol.11, Société d'émulation du Bourbonnais, Imprimerie Etienne Auclaire, 1903.
 Bulletin de la Société de l'histoire de France, Société de l'histoire de France, 1855.
 Cartulaire de l'abbaye cardinale de la Trinité de Vendôme, Vol.5, 1904.
 Cartulaire de Marmoutier pour le Vendômois, Vol.1, Société archéologique, scientifique et littéraire, Typographie Lemercier, 1891.
 Chalmel, Jean Louis, Histoire de Touraine, Vol.3, 1828.
 Fanning, Steven, A bishop and his world before the Gregorian reform: Hubert of Angers, 1006-1047, DIANE Publishing, 1988.
 Le Paige, André René, Dictionnaire topographique, historique, généalogique, Vol.2, Imprimerie de L'Ouest, A. Nezan, 1845.
 Regesta regum Anglo-Normannorum: the Acta of William I, 1066-1087, Ed. David Bates, Oxford University Press, 1988.
 Sandret, Louis, Revue nobiliaire historique et biographique, Vol.2, Quai des Augustins, 1866.
 Véron, Teddy, L'intégration des Mauges à l'Anjou au XIe siècle, Presses Universitaires de Limoges.

Further reading
 Les comtes de Vendôme
 Les seigneurs du Bas-Vendômois

Montoire